Edward Beyer (1820–1865) was a German landscape painter who was active in the United States and became known for his depiction of the Antebellum South.

Biography
He was born Eduard Beyer in Aachen, and was a graduate of the Düsseldorf Academy of Art, or the Kunstakademie Düsseldorf, where he studied between 1837 and 1838 under Joseph Wintergerst and Rudolf Wiegmann. He traveled to the United States in 1848 with his wife, living first in Newark, New Jersey and later in Philadelphia, Pennsylvania and Cincinnati, Ohio.

He visited Virginia in 1854 and stayed until about 1856 or 1857 sketching and painting a number of scenes that would appear in his "Album of Virginia" (1857).

Edward Beyer eventually returned to Germany and died at Munich in 1865.

Artistic style

Beyer's style was formed at the Dusseldorf Academy with its tradition of Classicism and Romanticism and critics hold a favorable view of Breyer's artistic endeavors.

In his painting of the Bellevue Plantation near Ridgeway, Henry County, Virginia, a homestead of the Andrew and Maria Lewis family, Beyer depicts eight slaves toiling in a wheat field. The painting is accomplished "in the dramatic style of the Dusseldorf Academy, which emphasized atmosphere, action and drama."

Some of his works comprised industrial scenes such as railroads and bridges, juxtaposing romanticism and realism.

The painting of what was Charleston, Virginia in 1854 was declared a painting trifecta by Antiques Roadshow (U.S. TV series) appraiser Colleene Fesko. Fesko said she was amazed when she saw the piece and had to pull out her glasses to fully examine in detail the panoramic work. While in Charleston, Beyer was offered a commission from a number of businessmen in the community. They had to have a lottery to decide who would own the painting, and it stayed with the same family ever since. Fesko said that Beyer created 40 panoramic landscape paintings of Virginia towns in the mid-19th century.

Art historians lauded Beyer's "delicate and precise style" and "characteristic refinement of proportion."

List of works

 Charleston, Virginia (now West Virginia)
 Natural Bridge (Virginia)
 Harper's Ferry from Jefferson Rock
 Rockfish Gap and the Mountain House 
 The High Bridge near Farmville 
 The drums. The tapestry Room. Weyers Cave
 Stribling Springs
 Burner's White Sulphur Spr. Shenandoah Co.
 White Sulphur Spring Montgomery
 View from the Peak of Otter
 View from the Hawks Nest
 Little tunnel near Shawsville, Va. & T.R.R.
 Old Sweet Springs
 Rockbridge Alum Spring
 Yellow Sulphur Springs
 Blue Sulphur Spring
 Falling Springs
 View from Gambles Hill
 Bullard Rock on the New River
 View's of Weyer's Cave
 Salt Sulphur Spring
 Red Sulphur Spring
 Salt Pond from the Salt Pond Knob
 Kanawha Fall
 U.S. Armory in Harpers Ferry
 Viaduct on Cheat River B & O.R.R.
 White Sulphur Springs
 Fauquier White Sulphur Springs
 Hot Springs
 Old Point Comfort. Hygeia Hotel
 View from Little Sewell Mountain
 James River Canal near the mouth of the North River
 View of the Peaks of Otter
 Red Sweet Springs
 Warm Springs.

Gallery

References

Further reading
 Edward Beyer. Description of the Album of Virginia: Or, The Old Dominion, Illustrated. Richmond, Va: Enquirer Book and Job Print. Office, 1857. 
 Edward Beyer. Album of Virginia. Lithographs by Rau & son, Dresden, and W. Locillot, Berlin. Richmond: s.n., 1858.
 Beyer, Edward. Edward Beyer's Cyclorama: malerische Reise nach New York und durch die Vereinigten Staaten von Nordamerika, zurück nach Hamburg. Dresden: Meinhold, 1860. 
 Edward Beyer's Cyclorama malerische Reise nach New York und durch die Vereinigten Staaten von Nordamerika, zurück nach Hamburg. Dresden: Meinhold, 1860. Microopaque. Louisville, Ky.: Lost Cause Press, 1962. 
 Beyer, Edward, Holle Schneider-Ricks, and George A. McLean. Edward Beyer's Travels Through America: An Artist's View; Including Edward Beyer's Cyclorama; Translated by Holle Schneider with an Introduction by George A. McLean, Jr. Roanoke, VA: Historical Society of Western Virginia, 2011.

External links

 Historical Hall of Fame: Edward Beyer, Virginia History Series 
 Edward Beyer in the National Gallery of Art
 Edward Beyer (1820-1865), Arader Galleries 
 Edward Beyer, AskArt

1820 births
1865 deaths
19th-century American painters
American male painters
19th-century German painters
German male painters
American landscape painters
German landscape painters
German emigrants to the United States
Düsseldorf school of painting
19th-century American male artists